The Tremont Avenue station is an express station on the IND Concourse Line of the New York City Subway. Located at the intersection of East Tremont Avenue and Grand Concourse, it is served by the D train at all times and B train during rush hours only. It has three tracks and two island platforms.

Station layout

The tile band is Claret red and the name mosaics are replicas of the 1933 originals. The I-beams have been painted a shade of red to match. Tile bands are also present in the mezzanines, and matching "T" (for Tremont) plaques have been fitted—the only IND station to feature these. A closed tower sits on the south end of the Manhattan-bound platform.

The 2000 artwork here is called Uptown New York by Frank Leslie Hampton. It uses a mixture of glass and marble mosaics to create a full width display of a Bronx apartment building with a rooftop garden, and clothes hanging out on a line to dry on a cloudy day. This mural is as wide as the mezzanine and faces the full-time booth area.

In 2019, the MTA announced that this station would become ADA-accessible as part of the agency's 2020–2024 Capital Program. An elevator will be installed to the southeastern corner of Echo Place and Grand Concourse. An alternate proposal for the installation of the elevator to the street would have placed it at the southwester corner of that intersection. Two elevators will lead from the southern fare control area to the two platforms. Substantial completion is projected for early October 2022.

Exits
The station had a full length mezzanine above the platforms. However, after a 1999 renovation, it was split into three sections. The northernmost and southernmost portions are separate fare control areas, and the central portion is now used as a storage area. 

In January 1992, the MTA proposed closing the free zone passageway on the east side of the station, connecting to the station entrances at Tremont Avenue and East 179th Street; prior to the station renovation, it was gated off. The middle portion as well as the passageways on the east and west sides have been walled off to the public.

The full-time booth is in the southern portion. It has three street stairs leading to all but the southeast corner of Grand Concourse and Echo Place, and two stairs to each platform. The street stair on the west side has a small passageway. The part-time side at the northern portion. It had its booth removed during the aforementioned renovation, has two street stairs, one to each side of the Concourse at 179th Street, and has two stairs to each platform.

References

External links 

 
 nycsubway.org — Uptown New York Artwork by Frank Leslie Hampton (2000)
 Station Reporter — B Train
 Station Reporter — D Train
 The Subway Nut — Tremont Avenue Pictures
 MTA's Arts For Transit — Tremont Avenue (IND Concourse Line)
 Echo Place entrance from Google Maps Street View
 179th Street entrance from Google Maps Street View
 Platforms from Google Maps Street View

IND Concourse Line stations
New York City Subway stations in the Bronx
Railway stations in the United States opened in 1933
1933 establishments in New York City
Tremont, Bronx